Len G. Choules (born 29 January 1932, in Orpington, Kent) is an English, retired professional footballer who played as a centre half. He made 259 appearances in the Football League for Crystal Palace and also played non-league football for Sutton United and Romford.

Playing career
Choules began his career as an amateur with Sutton United and signed professional terms with Crystal Palace in May 1951. His Football League debut was not until April 1953 in a 1–1 home draw against Ipswich Town and between then and 1962, Choules made a total of 259 League appearances for Crystal Palace, scoring three times and was ever present in season 1956–57. He was also a part of the side which achieved promotion from the Fourth Division, in season 1960–61.

During his time with Crystal Palace, Choules was granted two testimonials and in 1954 was selected in an FA XI to play against Oxford University He was released by Crystal Palace on a free transfer in 1962 and moved into non-league football with Romford, but retired shortly thereafter.

References

External links

Len Choules at holmesdale.net

1932 births
Footballers from Orpington
English footballers
Association football defenders
English Football League players
Sutton United F.C. players
Crystal Palace F.C. players
Romford F.C. players
Living people